Alex Broadhurst (born March 7, 1993) is an American professional ice hockey forward who is currently  playing for Avangard Omsk in the Kontinental Hockey League (KHL). He has formerly played with the Columbus Blue Jackets of the National Hockey League (NHL).

Playing career
Broadhurst was drafted by the Chicago Blackhawks, 199th overall in the 7th round of the 2011 NHL Entry Draft. He played two seasons with the Green Bay Gamblers in the United States Hockey League (USHL), and one with the London Knights in the Ontario Hockey League (OHL). In 2012, he led the Gamblers in scoring and was named to the 2011–12 All-USHL First Team. On April 24, 2012, Broadhurst scored a short-handed hat-trick for the Gamblers in its 6–3 win over the Youngstown Phantoms in Game 3 of the USHL Eastern Division semifinal series. It was the first shorthanded hat trick scored in the history of the USHL.

In 2011, he represented the United States at the World Junior A Challenge where the team took third place.
  
On June 14, 2013, the Blackhawks agreed to terms with Broadhurst for a three-year entry-level contract. In September 2013, he was assigned to the Blackhawks-affiliated Rockford IceHogs.

On June 30, 2015, Broadhurst was included in the trade of Brandon Saad by the Blackhawks to the Columbus Blue Jackets in exchange for Jeremy Morin, Marko Dano, Artem Anisimov, Corey Tropp and a fourth-round draft pick in 2016.

During his third season within the Blue Jackets organization in 2017–18, Broadhurst was recalled by Columbus on April 3, 2018, and made his NHL debut for the Blue Jackets against the Detroit Red Wings. He was scoreless in two games with the Blue Jackets before he was returned to the Monsters.

In the 2018–19 season, while providing a veteran presence with the Cleveland Monsters, on February 25, 2019, Broadhurst was traded by the Blue Jackets to the Winnipeg Jets for future considerations. It was immediately announced that Broadhurst would continue in the AHL with the Monsters on loan from the Jets.

In the off-season, Broadhurst having left the Jets as a free agent, opted to continue his career in the AHL, agreeing to a one-year contract with the San Diego Gulls, affiliate to the Anaheim Ducks, on August 14, 2019. In his lone season with the Gulls in the 2019–20 season, Broadhurst served as an alternate captain and contributed with 9 goals and 24 points in 51 regular season games before the season was cancelled due to the COVID-19 pandemic.

As a free agent, Broadhurst opted to pursue a career abroad, agreeing to a one-year contract with Finnish club, HIFK of the Liiga, on June 28, 2020. Broadhurst remained with HIFK for two years, leaving the club as a free agent after posting 11 goals and 34 points through 41 regular season games in the 2021–22 season.

On June 23, 2022, Broadhurst was signed to a one-year contract to join Russian club, Avangard Omsk of the KHL.

Personal
Alex's older brother Terry Broadhurst was also rostered with IceHogs over the 2013–14 season.

Career statistics

Regular season and playoffs

International

Awards and honors

References

External links

1993 births
American men's ice hockey centers
Chicago Blackhawks draft picks
Cleveland Monsters players
Columbus Blue Jackets players
Green Bay Gamblers players
HIFK (ice hockey) players
Ice hockey players from Illinois
Lake Erie Monsters players
Living people
London Knights players
Rockford IceHogs (AHL) players
San Diego Gulls (AHL) players